The Manhattan Beach Unified School District is responsible for public education in the city of Manhattan Beach, California.  It oversees one preschool, five elementary schools, one middle school, and one high school.

MBUSD serves the city of Manhattan Beach. In addition, residents of Hermosa Beach may choose to attend Redondo Union High School of the Redondo Beach Unified School District or the Mira Costa High School of MBUSD.

The district as a whole received a score of 906 on the 2006 California Academic Performance Index (API), making it one of California's best performing districts.  Each individual school also ranks at the top of its respective category.

The school district has a history of failing to accommodate the needs of special education students.  One such case was that of Douglas Shulby, who, in 1998, was forcibly removed from the Mira Costa campus grounds by law enforcement and school officials, due to a failure to accommodate his special needs associated with his Asperger syndrome.

Similar efforts have been documented as in Porter v. Manhattan Beach school District.

Schools

Preschool 

 Manhattan Beach Preschool

Elementary Schools 

 Grand View Elementary School
 Meadows Elementary School
 Pacific Elementary School
 Pennekamp Elementary School
 Robison Elementary School

Middle School 
Manhattan Beach Middle School

High School 
Mira Costa High School

History
Residents of the district were in the Manhattan Beach elementary school district and South Bay Union High School District until 1993, when it dissolved. Manhattan Beach USD formed in 1993 as a result.

References

External links
 Manhattan Beach Unified School District

School districts in Los Angeles County, California
Manhattan Beach, California
1993 establishments in California
School districts established in 1993